San Rafael Bay is an embayment of San Pablo Bay, located in Marin County and the northern San Francisco Bay Area, California.

Geography
San Pablo Bay is the northern bay section of the larger San Francisco Bay, in the North Bay region.

San Rafael Bay is located along the Marin County coast, adjacent to the City of San Rafael. 

The Marin Islands are within bay. The river mouth and estuary of San Rafael Creek is located at its shoreline.

See also

References

Bays of San Francisco Bay
San Pablo Bay
Bays of Marin County, California
Landforms of the San Francisco Bay Area
San Rafael, California
Bays of California